The 1998 Nashville tornado outbreak was a two-day tornado outbreak which affected portions of the Midwestern United States, Mississippi and Tennessee Valleys on April 15 and April 16, 1998, with the worst of the outbreak taking place on the second day. On that day, at least ten tornadoes swept through Middle Tennessee—three of them touching down in Nashville, causing significant damage to the downtown and East Nashville areas. Nashville became the first major city in nearly 20 years to have an F2 or larger tornado make a direct hit in the downtown area.

Confirmed tornadoes

April 15 event

April 16 event

See also
List of North American tornadoes and tornado outbreaks
1998 Nashville tornado outbreak

Notes

References

F5 tornadoes
Tornadoes of 1998
Tornadoes in Tennessee
20th century in Nashville, Tennessee
1998 natural disasters in the United States
April 1998 events